Mikel Azurmendi (Spain, 10 December 1942 – 6 August 2021) was a Spanish anthropologist, ETA dissident, and writer. He was the co-founder of Foro Ermua and ¡Basta Ya!.

References

1942 births
2021 deaths
Spanish anthropologists
ETA (separatist group) activists
University of Paris alumni
University of the Basque Country alumni
Academic staff of the University of the Basque Country
People from San Sebastián
Recipients of the Order of Constitutional Merit